Roman Malinowski (26 February 1935 – 31 August 2021) was a Polish politician and economist. He served as Deputy Prime Minister from 1980 to 1985, Chairman of United People's Party from 1981 to 1989, and Marshal of the Sejm from 1985 to 1989.

References

1935 births
2021 deaths
People from Białystok
People from Białystok Voivodeship (1919–1939)
20th-century Polish politicians
21st-century Polish politicians
Polish economists
Marshals of the Sejm
Members of the Polish Sejm 1976–1980
Members of the Polish Sejm 1980–1985
Members of the Polish Sejm 1985–1989
United People's Party (Poland) politicians
SGH Warsaw School of Economics alumni
Knights of the Order of Polonia Restituta
Officers of the Order of Polonia Restituta
Recipients of the Order of the Banner of Work